Kaden Hensel and Adam Hubble were the defending champions but decided not to participate this year.
Treat Conrad Huey and Vasek Pospisil won the final against David Rice and Sean Thornley 6–0, 6–1.

Seeds

Draw

Draw

External links
 Main Draw

Challenger Banque Nationale de Rimouski
Challenger de Drummondville